Grant Lauchlan is best known for his work as a Scottish entertainment journalist, producer and film reporter for STV in Scotland.

He studied journalism, politics and film & media at Stirling University. After graduating he worked as a news reporter for Radio Clyde. In 1998, Lauchlan started working as an assistant producer for STV's digital channel S2. In 2000, he began working for Scotland Today as a film reporter.

After S2 closed down, he began working full-time in the newsroom as a journalist and occasional presenter of Scotland Today news bulletins. In 2001 Lauchlan pitched the idea for Moviejuice to STV execs and the series was commissioned and ran until 2005. Lauchlan then worked as an entertainment reporter for STV News.  Moviejuice returned to STV in 2009 with a one-off Star Trek movie special presented and produced by Lauchlan. He fronted further Moviejuice specials that included The Twilight Saga: New Moon, Prometheus, Skyfall and Harry Potter. In 2012 a new reformatted series of Moviejuice returned to STV on Friday nights fronted and co-produced by the presenter.  The popular show was a ratings hit but was eventually axed due to budget cuts as STV streamed programming cash into its (now failed) STV2 channel.

Lauchlan is regarded as one of Scotland's most under-rated and under-used TV stars. He is known for his easy-going rapport and witty interview style with A-listers and over the years he has secured interviews with many of Hollywood's biggest names including Meryl Streep, Arnold Schwarzenegger, Leonardo DiCaprio, Jim Carrey, Julie Andrews, Angelina Jolie, Samuel L. Jackson, Scarlett Johansson, Sigourney Weaver and George Clooney, to name but a few.  Bruce Willis has publicly said that Lauchlan is one of the best presenters to have interviewed him and told his boss in numerous interviews to give the presenter a raise.

Lauchlan left STV in 2018. He was linked to a new series of That's Life for the BBC as one of its team of presenters led by Victoria Coren Mitchell.

Lauchlan in the past decade has turned his hand to property development and spends much of his time living on the Isle of Arran.

References

External links

Scottish film critics
Living people
Scottish television presenters
STV News newsreaders and journalists
Year of birth missing (living people)